Pamarthy Shankar is an artist, caricaturist and cartoonist from Hyderabad, India. He is currently working as chief cartoonist for Sakshi, a daily newspaper in Hyderabad published in Telugu.

He has won several national and international prizes in cartoon and caricature contents both nationally and internationally, such as the Grand Prix World Press Cartoon Award 2014 in Portugal. He is the first person in Asia to receive such prestigious award. He is the only person in India who got many International Awards in Cartoon and Caricature contests. He is also invited as Jury for several international and national competitions. The uniqueness of his cartoons and caricatures is not in drawing the attention of viewers by nagging or mocking but instead through charm and exaggeration of the subject persons prominent features. His caricatures of prominent people have received wide accolades and given him prominence.

He has frequent exhibitions nationally and internationally.

Awards and Prizes
3rd Prize in Hindustan Times caricature Art contest 2000 - India

First Prize in Tabriz International cartoon contest 2005 - Iran

First Prize in Brazil International caricature Art contest 2008 - Brazil

Best Political Cartoonist Award, Government of Andhra Pradesh 2007 - India

3rd Prize in Mayakamath memorial awards for excellence in Political cartooning 2008 - India

First Prize in Oommen Chandy Caricature Contest, Kerala 2012 - India

First Prize in Brazil International caricature contest  2013 - Brazil

Silver Medal in China portraiture contest  2013 - China

Elected as Special jury member for Iran International Caricature Contest  2014 - Iran

World Press Cartoon Grand Prix Award  2014 - Portugal

Silver Medal in The 2nd International Caricature Art Competition 2015 - China

First Prize in Third International Art Festival of Resistance 2015 - Iran

First prize in the Festival of Humour Festival Veredas de Humor - Brazil

Winner of The Chamber of municipality of de Humor de Piracicaba 2016 - Brazil

State Award - Government of Telangana State 2016 - India

Third Winner of The Second International Holocaust Caricature Art Contest 2017 - Iran

Special Prize in Trumpism Cartoon & Caricature contest 2017 - Iran

Honorable Mention in World press cartoon 2017 - Portugal

Honorable Mention in Porto Cartoon 2017 - Portugal

Special Jury member for 11th Tehran International Biennial Cartoon contest 2017 - Iran

Honorable Mention in Porto cartoon 2018 - Portugal

Excellent Award in The First International Caricature Portrait Festival 2018 – Beijing, CHINA

Second Prize in The End of Terrorism Cartoon & Caricature Contest 2018 - Iran

Excellent Award in The First International Portrait Caricature Exhibition 2018 - China

Exhibitions 
2005 - Shankar's Making Faces - Solo Exhibition at Lakshana Art Gallery, Hyderabad

2007 - Hyderabad Artists - Two Men Show at Amaravathi Kalakendra, Hyderabad

2009 - Shankar's Caricatures - Solo Exhibition at Alankritha Art Gallery, Hyderabad

2011 - Faces Unmasked - Solo Exhibition at ICC Gallery, Bangalore

2014 - “Art@Telangana” group exhibition at Muse Art Gallery, Hyderabad

2014 - “Art@Telangana” group exhibition at Salarjung Museum, Hyderabad

2015 - “Art for Cause” group show organized by Gallery Space, Hyderabad

2015 - “Art Fete 2015” Platinum Jubilee Celebrations by Hyderabad Art Society, Muse Art Gallery, Hyderabad

2016 - “Hyderabad Art Festival” 75 years Platinum Celebrations Organized by Hyderabad Art Society, Hyderabad

2016 - “Art for Impact” by Dr.Reddy's Foundation in association with Gallery Space at Avasa Hotel, Hyderabad

2019 - "The Inked-Image" an exhibition of cartoons and caricatures at Ravindra bharathi, Kala Bhavan, Hyderabad

Collections 
Abdul Kalam - Former President of India

Google India - Hyderabad

KCR - Chief Minister of Telangana

Padmashri Jagdish Mittal - Art collector

Chiranjeevi - Film Actor

Private Collections in India and abroad

References

External links
 Examples of Parmarthy's work: 

Indian cartoonists
1968 births
Living people
Telugu people